Sawilowsky is a surname. Notable people with the surname include:

Pat Sawilowsky (1930–2014), American administrator
Shlomo Sawilowsky (born 1954), American statistician, son of Pat

Jewish surnames